Jean Perrot (1920 – 24 December 2012) was a French archaeologist who specialised in the late prehistory of the Middle East and Near East.

Biography
Perrot was a graduate of the Ecole du Louvre where he studied under two experts in Syrian archaeology; André Parrot and René Dussaud. He went on to study at the École biblique et archéologique française de Jérusalem in 1945.

He researched a number of ancient sites in Iran, Israel and Turkey, animating the research at international level. He first went to Iran in 1968, a year after the retirement of Roman Ghirshman, to head the Delegation Archéologique Français (DAFI) and excavations of the country's ancient sites. He headed a multidisciplinary team in conjunction with the Iranian Centre of Archaeological Research, including experts from France, Iran and the United States who continued studies until the revolution in 1979. He worked on sites such as Susa and Jafar Abad and took measures to safeguard the vestiges of the Achaemenid period (between the sixth and fourth century BC). His notable discoveries included ancient items such as the headless statue of Darius which is now housed in the National Museum of Iran in Tehran.

In Israel Perrot excavated at Munhata, Ain Mallaha and the Chalcolithic sites at Abu Matar and Bir es-Safadi near Beersheba, belonging to the so-called Beer Sheva culture.

In 1952, Perrot founded the "Mission archéologique française", now called the French Research Center in Jerusalem; a joint research unit of the General Directorate for International Cooperation and Development and the CNRS. It is the CNRS's oldest foreign branch and became a permanent archaeological base in 1974. The current director since 1996 is Dominique Bourel.

In 1973, Perrot founded the notable journal Paléorient with Bernard Vandermeersch along with the aid of the Wenner-Gren Foundation. In 1975, this became a publication of the CNRS. The journal is now published twice a year and distributed in twenty-two countries, it is recognized for presentations and discussions of research in all aspects of the prehistory and protohistory of the near and middle east.

Perrot returned to France to become director of the CNRS, which he joined in 1946 and for which he was an honorary research director and correspondent.

Selected bibliography
 Perrot, Jean., Et ils sortirent du paradis ... , carnets d'un archéologue en Orient, 1945–1995, Editions de Fallois, 334 pages, 1997.
 Perrot, Jean., Le palais de Darius à Suse: une résidence royale sur la route de Persépolis à Babylone, Presses de l'université Paris-Sorbonne, 520 pages, 2010.
 Perrot, J. and Y. Madjidzadeh, 2003 Découvertes récentes á Jiroft (sud du plateau Iranien), CRAIBL, pp. 1087–1102.
 Perrot, Jean, Darius le Grand - Roi de Perse - Roi de Babylone – Rois des Rois – Pharaon d’Egypte (522-486 av. J.-C.), Dossiers d’Archéologie, hors série n° 23, janvier 2013, 78 pages.

References

External links
Paléorient Journal Information
Jean Perrot bibliography
Payvand Iran News Jean Perrot: Jiroft Is the Archaeological Capital of the World 2/8/05
CNRS – French Research Center in Jerusaelem
Le Palais de Darius à Suse: conférence de Jean Perrot
Bibliomonde – Jean Perrot
librariedialogues.fr – Jean Perrot Biography
La Revue pour l'histoire du CNRS
Great archeologist and researcher of Susa, Jean Perrot dies at age 92   at Tavoos Art Magazine site
 Obituary in the Journal of the Israel Prehistoric Society, vol. 43 

French archaeologists
French Iranologists
École pratique des hautes études alumni
People from Doubs
2012 deaths
1920 births
Farabi International Award recipients
Members of the American Philosophical Society
Research directors of the French National Centre for Scientific Research